is a city located in Shiga Prefecture, Japan. , the city had an estimated population of 70,312 in 29068 households and a population density of 1300 persons per km². It is well known to Japanese horse racing fans because it is home to one of the two Japan Racing Association's training centers and the famous jockey brothers, Yutaka Take and Koshiro Take who were also born in Rittō.

Geography
Located in the southern part of Shiga prefecture,  Rittō is located on Japan's main transportation arteries. The Tōkaidō Shinkansen, JR Tōkaidō Main Line, Meishin Expressway, Shin-Meishin Expressway, Japan National Route 1 and Japan National Route 8 all pass through the city. The opening of highway interchanges and new train station has led to increasing urbanization, as the city is within commuting distance of Kyoto and Osaka, and is relatively close to Nagoya to the east. About half of them city area is mountainous.

Neighboring municipalities 
Shiga Prefecture
Yasu
Konan
Kōka
Ōtsu
Kusatsu
Moriyama

Climate
Rittō has a Humid subtropical climate (Köppen Cfa) characterized by warm summers and cool winters with light to no snowfall.  The average annual temperature in Rittō is 14.0 °C. The average annual rainfall is 1430 mm with September as the wettest month. The temperatures are highest on average in August, at around 26.0 °C, and lowest in January, at around 2.5 °C.

Demographics
Per Japanese census data, the population of Rittō increased rapidly since the 1960s.

History 
Rittō is part of ancient Ōmi Province. During the Edo Period, much of the area which became Rittō was under control of either Zeze Domain or was tenryo territory directly administered by the Tokugawa shogunate. The area was organized into villages within Kurita District, Shiga with the establishment of the modern municipalities system on April 1, 1889. On October 1, 1954 the villages of Konze, Hayama, Haruta and Daihō were merged to create the town of Rittō.

The kanji characters for Rittō are "chestnut" (栗; kuri) and "East" (東; higashi), despite the fact that Rittō is located in western Japan and is not known for chestnut trees. The name was taken from its location in the eastern portion of former Kurita District (栗太郡; Kurita-gun).

The Japan Racing Association opened the Ritto Horse Training Center on November 11, 1969, and has been one of the two major training centers for race horses in Japan.

Rittō was raised to city status on October 1, 2001.

Government
Rittō has a mayor-council form of government with a directly elected mayor and a unicameral city council of 18 members. Rittō contributes two members to the Shiga Prefectural Assembly. In terms of national politics, the city is part of Shiga 3rd district of the lower house of the Diet of Japan.

Economy
The economy of Rittō was formerly centered on agriculture; however due to its location near the major population centers of Kyoto and Osaka and on major transportation arteries, it is increasing industrialized, with the city government aggressively pursuing the development of industrial parks. Sekisui Chemical and Nissin Foods are major employers.

Education
Rittō has nine public elementary schools and three public middle schools operated by the city government. There are two public high schools operated by the Shiga Prefectural Department of Education. The prefecture also operates one special education school for the handicapped.

Transportation

Railway
 JR West – Biwako Line
 
 JR West – Kusatsu Line

Highway
  Meishin Expressway

Sister city relations 
  Birmingham, Michigan, United States (1976)
  Hengyang, Hunan, China

Local attractions 
Otsuki Taisha, Shinto shrine
Wachūsan Honpo, Edo Period pharmacy, National Historic Site
Komasaka Stone Buddhas, National Historic Site

Notable people
Yuichi Fukunaga, jockey
Yutaka Kobayashi (actor), actor
Masanori Morita, mangaka
Koshiro Take, jockey
 Yutaka Take, jockey

References

External links

 Rittō City official website 

Cities in Shiga Prefecture
Rittō, Shiga